Gasdermin A is a protein that in humans is encoded by the GSDMA gene.

References

Further reading